magnussoft ZETA, earlier yellowTAB ZETA, was an operating system formerly developed by yellowTAB of Germany based on the Be Operating System developed by Be Inc.; because of yellowTAB's insolvency, ZETA was later being developed by an independent team of which little was known, and distributed by magnussoft. As of February 28, 2007 the current version of ZETA is 1.5. On March 28, 2007, magnussoft announced that it has discontinued funding the development of ZETA by March 16, because the sales figures had fallen far short of the company's expectations, so that the project was no longer economically viable. A few days later, the company also stopped the distribution of ZETA in reaction to allegations that ZETA constituted an illegal unlicensed derivative of the BeOS source code and binaries.

Development 
ZETA was an effort to bring BeOS up to date, adding support for newer hardware, and features that had been introduced in other operating systems in the years since Be Incorporated ceased development in 2001. Among the new features were USB 2.0 support, SATA support, samba support, a new media player, and enhanced localization of system components. Unlike Haiku and other open source efforts to recreate some or all of BeOS's functionality from scratch, ZETA was based on the actual BeOS code base, and it is closed source.

ZETA contributed to an increase in activity in the BeOS commercial software market, with a number of new products for both ZETA and the earlier BeOS being released.

However, some critics point to a list of goals for the first release that do not appear to have been met (including Java 1.4.2 and ODBC support). Other reviewers point to bugs that still exist from BeOS, and question whether yellowTAB has the complete access to the source code they would need to make significant updates.

Some changes that were made could break compilation of code, and in some cases (most notably Mozilla), break the actual application if any code optimizations are applied, resulting in much slower builds.

YellowTAB promoted ZETA mainly in the German market, where it used to be sold through infomercials and on RTL Shop, and in Japan still being a beta version. Prior to Magnussoft stopping the distribution of ZETA, it was mainly distributed directly by magnussoft.

Versions

Criticism 

ZETA and yellowTAB have been surrounded by controversy. Critics of yellowTAB questioned for a long time the legality of ZETA, and whether yellowTAB had legal access to the sources of BeOS; it is now known that yellowTAB could not have developed ZETA to the extent that they did without access to the source code, but doubts remain as to whether yellowTAB actually had legal access to the code or not.

Furthermore, critics did not see ZETA as real advancement of BeOS, but rather as an unfinished and buggy operating system loaded with third party applications that were either obsolete, unsupported, or non-functional. This was particularly true in the initial releases of ZETA, and it was in clear conflict with the attention to detail that BeOS used to stand for, disappointing the BeOS community who at one point had high expectations for ZETA. While yellowTAB did clean up the selection of bundled applications in following versions, ZETA remains somewhat unstable when compared to other modern desktop operating systems.

But perhaps the most criticized practice by yellowTAB was its tendency to make claims that turned out to be either half truths or vague enough that they could not be confirmed. Not only did yellowTAB announce certain developments that never materialized (such as Java, and ODBC among others), but it would also support certain capabilities beyond what ZETA was actually capable of (e.g., compatibility with MS Office). According to sources close to yellowTAB, this is believed to have led to a high return rate from customers that bought ZETA from the German RTL TV shopping channel, and the reason for which RTL eventually stopped selling the product.

There was some criticism within the greater BeOS community regarding the lack of a "personal" edition of Zeta. This is a somewhat controversial standpoint, given the history of BeOS and Be Inc. Throughout the life of the Intel version of BeOS, Be Inc regularly created and distributed BeOS demo discs on CD. The discs were somewhat crippled and would not mount a BFS partition nor would they install to a physical hard drive. They served as a test for hardware support and a taster for the Operating System. Zeta was offered in a similar way – demo discs with similar limitations were made available. Unfortunately, many in the BeOS community, especially those who came to BeOS post the demise of Be Inc, tended to have an issue with the "crippled" demo discs. The controversy is as follows: the final commercial release of BeOS, Revision 5, included a freely distributable "virtual" BeOS installation. The installer created a virtual BeOS image in a file on the host OS, and the computer could then boot into BeOS using a boot disk or via the installation of Bootman (the native BeOS boot manager.) Be Inc intended this release to be a taster and to draw users into buying the Professional edition, which was fully installable to a physical hard drive partition. Unfortunately, many users discovered that it was a trivial task to install the personal version to a real partition, and so Be Inc ultimately lost much of the sales potential for the product. Both YellowTab and Magnussoft learnt from this, and therefore did not offer a version of Zeta that could be installed without purchasing a license.

German language – the Zeta initial builds and much of the packaging was geared towards a German-speaking audience. This was reduced in later versions, but the first few BETA releases and release candidates had many oddities where Zeta would fall back to German, no matter what locale was set.

Version 1.0 of Zeta included a badly thought out activation component, which requires a code to be entered and authenticated via a remote server before the nag screen will stop and full functionality is restored. The nag is fairly easily circumvented by replacing the executable called with a stub executable, but the activation was incredibly poorly executed and often failed. The activation was removed by the 1.21 release.

Cease of distribution 
A cease of distribution letter was posted by Magnussoft on 5 April 2007.

See also 
 Comparison of operating systems

References

External links 
 ZETA 1.5 Review – Reviewed by Thom Holwerda for OSNews

BeOS
Proprietary operating systems